This is a list of schools in the London Borough of Bromley, England.

State-funded schools

Primary schools
Source. (CE indicates Church of England and RC Roman Catholic schools).

 Alexandra Infant School
 Alexandra Junior School
 Balgowan Primary School
 Bickley Primary School
 Biggin Hill Primary School
 Blenheim Primary School
 Burnt Ash Primary School
 Chelsfield Primary School
 Churchfields Primary School
 Clare House Primary School
 Crofton Infant School
 Crofton Junior School
 Cudham Primary School (CE)
 Darrick Wood Infant School
 Darrick Wood Junior School
 Downe Primary School
 Edgebury Primary School
 Elmstead Wood Primary School
 Farnborough Primary School
 Gray's Farm Primary Academy
 Green Street Green Primary School
 Harris Primary Academy Beckenham
 Harris Primary Academy Beckenham Green
 Harris Primary Academy Crystal Palace
 Harris Primary Academy Kent House
 Harris Primary Academy Orpington
 Harris Primary Academy Shortlands
 Hawes Down Primary School
 Hayes Primary School
 Highfield Infants' School
 Highfield Junior School
 The Highway Primary School
 Holy Innocents Primary School (RC)
 James Dixon Primary School
 Keston Primary School (CE)
 La Fontaine Academy
 Langley Park Primary School
 Leesons Primary School
 Manor Oak Primary School
 Marian Vian Primary School
 Mead Road Infant School
 Midfield Primary School
 Mottingham Primary School
 Oak Lodge Primary School
 Oaklands Primary Academy
 Parish Primary School (CE)
 Perry Hall Primary School
 Pickhurst Academy
 Pickhurst Infant Academy
 Poverest Primary School
 Pratts Bottom Primary School
 Raglan Primary School
 Red Hill Primary School
 St Anthony's Primary School (RC)
 St George's Primary School (CE)
 St James' Primary School (RC)
 St John's Primary School (CE)
 St Joseph's Primary School (RC)
 St Mark's Primary School (CE)
 St Mary Cray Primary Academy
 St Mary's Primary School (RC)
 St Nicholas Primary School (CE)
 St Paul's Cray Primary School (CE)
 St Peter and St Paul Primary School (RC)
 St Philomena's Primary School (RC)
 St Vincent's Primary School (RC)
 Scotts Park Primary School
 Southborough Primary School
 Stewart Fleming Primary School
 Trinity Primary School (CE)
 Tubbenden Primary School
 Unicorn Primary School
 Valley Primary School
 Warren Road Primary School
 Wickham Common Primary School
 Worsley Bridge Primary School

Secondary schools
Source.

 Bishop Justus Church of England School
 Bullers Wood School
 Bullers Wood School for Boys
 Charles Darwin School
 Chislehurst School for Girls
 Coopers School
 Darrick Wood School
 Eden Park High School
 Harris Academy Beckenham 
 Harris Academy Bromley
 Harris Academy Orpington
 Hayes School
 Kemnal Technology College
 Langley Park School for Boys
 Langley Park School for Girls
 Ravens Wood School
 Ravensbourne School

Grammar schools
 Newstead Wood School
 St Olave's and St Saviour's Grammar School

Special and alternative schools
 Beckmead Park Academy*
 Bromley Beacon Academy
 Bromley Trust Alternative Provision Academy
 Glebe School
 Marjorie McClure School
 Riverside School

*This school is located in Bromley, but is for pupils from Croydon

Further education
 Bromley College of Further & Higher Education

Independent schools

Primary and preparatory schools
 Ashgrove School
 Bickley Park School
 Breaside Preparatory School
 St Christopher's The Hall School
 St David's Prep

Senior and all-through schools

 Babington House School
 Bishop Challoner School
 Bromley High School
 Darul Uloom London
 Eltham College
 Farringtons School
 Kings London
 Wickham Court school

Special and alternative schools
 Baston House School
 Browns School
 Clannad Education Centre
 Kent House Hospital School
 TLC The Learning Centre
 The Tutorial Foundation

References

 
Bromley